Iyal Sayad is a sub-district located in Nihm District, Sana'a Governorate, Yemen. Iyal Sayad had a population of 10364 according to the 2004 census.

References 

Sub-districts in Nihm District